Carex mckittrickensis, the Guadalupe Mountain sedge, is a species of sedge endemic to Guadalupe Mountains National Park in western Texas. It occurs on the sides of steep ravines and also in riparian forests.

Description
Its stems are round in cross-section and covered with reddish-brown leaf sheaths toward the base. Staminate (male) flowering spikes form at the top of the plant, with pistillate (female) spikes in axils of the leaves.

Taxonomy
Carex mckittrickensis is very closely related to the widespread Carex eburnea, but differs in the large size of many of its floral parts. It was described in 1998 by Peter W. Ball of the University of Toronto, and named after McKittrick Canyon in the Guadalupe Mountains National Park.

References

mckittrickensis
Endemic flora of Texas
Plants described in 1998